Lower Brynamman is  an electoral ward of Neath Port Talbot county borough in Brynamman, Wales.

Electoral ward 
The electoral ward of Lower Brynamman forms part of the parish of Gwaun-Cae-Gurwen.  The ward consists of some or all of the settlements of Gwaun-Cae-Gurwen, Lower Brynamman and Tairgwaith in the parliamentary constituency of Neath. The ward has settlements to the far east; however, most of the ward is dominated by current and disused open cast mine workings. It is bounded by the wards of Quarter Bach of Carmarthenshire to the north, Cwmllynfell to the south east, and Gwaun-Cae-Gurwen to the south west.

In the May 2017 Neath Port Talbot County Borough Council election, the results were:

In the 2012 local council elections, Arwyn Woolcock of the Labour Party was returned unopposed.

References

Electoral wards of Neath Port Talbot
Amman Valley